Nigel Heseltine (3 July 1916 – 1995) was an English author of travel books, short stories, plays, and poetry, as well as an agronomist for the Food and Agriculture Organization of the United Nations.

Biography
Heseltine was born in London in 1916, the son of composer Philip Heseltine, better known as Peter Warlock. His mother is often reported to be Minnie Lucy Channing, an occasional model for Augustus John, nicknamed "Puma". However, in his memoir Capriol for Mother, Heseltine states that his mother was a Swiss woman, a friend of Juliette Huxley. He spent most of his childhood in Wales with Warlock's mother and Welsh stepfather at Cefn Bryntalch, Llandyssil, and attended Shrewsbury School.

In 1937 he travelled on foot across Albania and wrote of his experience in Scarred Background. In 1938 he married Natalia Borisovna Galitzine or Galitzina, an aristocrat in Budapest. He married four more times. During World War II he was in Dublin, working as a playwright for the Olympia Theatre company of Shelagh Richards (1903–1985).

In the 1950s he was based in Rome working as an agronomist for the United Nations Food and Agriculture Organization. During this time he travelled widely across Africa, eventually settling in Madagascar for twelve years, and then on Rodrigues as Resident Commissioner. Later he wrote several books about Africa, including From Libyan Sands to Chad (an account of crossing the Sahara) and Madagascar.

Towards the end of his career he was employed by the Department of Aboriginal Affairs of Western Australia, travelling extensively in the Outback. He retired in Perth, where he died in 1995.

Works

Scarred Background (a Journey Through Albania) (1938)
Violent Rain: a Poem The Latin Press (1938)
The Four-Walled Dream: Poems The Fortune Press (1941)
Dafydd ap Gwilym, Selected poems (1944, Cuala Press) translator
Tales of the Squirearchy, Druid Press, 1946
The Mysterious Pregnancy: a novel (published as Inconstant Lady in the U.S.A.) 1953
From Libyan Sands to Chad (1959)
Remaking Africa (1961)
Twenty-five Poems, Dafydd ap Gwilym (1968, Piers Press, reprint of 1944 book) translator
Madagascar (1971)
Capriol for Mother (1992), a memoir of Peter Warlock and his family by his son

References
Rhian Davies, Scarred Background: Nigel Heseltine (1916–1995), A Biographical Introduction and a Bibliography, in Welsh Writing in English: A Yearbook of Critical Essays, Volume 11 (2006-7)

1916 births
1995 deaths
Welsh short story writers
Welsh travel writers
20th-century Welsh poets
20th-century Welsh dramatists and playwrights
20th-century British short story writers